Arytera nekorensis is a species of plant in the family Sapindaceae. It is endemic to New Caledonia.

References

Endemic flora of New Caledonia
nekorensis
Vulnerable plants
Taxonomy articles created by Polbot